At the 1964 Summer Olympics in Tokyo, the athletics competition included 36 events, 24 for men and 12 for women.  The women's 400 metres and women's pentathlon events were newly introduced at these Games. There were a total number of 1016 participating athletes from 82 countries.

Medal summary

Men

Women

Medal table

References
International Olympic Committee results database
Athletics Australia

 
1964
Athletics
Olympics
International athletics competitions hosted by Japan
1964 Olympics